James Campbell,  (26 January 1935 – 31 May 2016) was a British historian, specialising in the medieval period and the Anglo-Saxons. He was a Fellow of Worcester College, Oxford, from 1957 until his retirement in 2002, and Professor of Medieval History at the University of Oxford from 1996 to 2002.

Early life and education
Campbell was born on 26 January 1935 in Cheltenham, Gloucestershire, England. His birth father, John Henry Mogg was a teacher and his mother Barbara Hilda Brown was also a teacher and member of the Communist Party. After a period in foster care he was adopted by his maternal grandparents in 1938. He studied at Lowestoft Grammar School, where he found an interest in history. He took early entry to Magdalen College, Oxford, at the age of 17 and graduated with a first in 1955.

Academic career
In 1956, Campbell took up a junior research fellowship at Merton College, Oxford. In 1957, at the age of 22, he was elected a Fellow at Worcester College, Oxford. He held additional college appointments, including Fellow Librarian (1977–2002) and senior tutor (1989–1993), and also served as the University of Oxford's Senior Proctor for the 1973/74 academic year. At university level teaching, he was a lecturer in modern history (as opposed to ancient history) from 1958 to 1990, Reader in Medieval History from 1990 to 1996, and Professor of Medieval History from 1996 to 2002. He delivered the Ford Lectures in the 1995/96 academic year. He remained at Worcester College until his retirement in 2002. 

Campbell's particular historical interest was in the medieval period and Anglo-Saxon studies. Along with Sonia Chadwick Hawkes and David Brown, in 1979 he founded the series Anglo-Saxon Studies in Archaeology and History. He was also interested in agriculture in Britain and Ireland from the 13th to 19th centuries. Two collections of his essays were published as Essays in Anglo-Saxon History in 1986 and The Anglo-Saxon State in 2000. He was the editor of The Anglo-Saxons (1982), a collection of essays on Anglo-Saxon England, for which he wrote the section on the period from AD 350 to 660. 

He was elected as a Fellow of the British Academy (FBA) in 1984. He had been elected Fellow of the Society of Antiquaries of London (FSA) in 1971.

Personal life
In the 1980s, Campbell moved out of college accommodation and settled in Witney, a village near Oxford. At the age of 71, he married Dr Bӓrbel Brodt on 7 October 2006. They did not have any children, and he was devastated by her death in October 2015.

He died at his home on 31 May 2016.

Selected works

References

External links
 Interviewed by Alan Macfarlane 4 September 2009 (video)

1935 births
2016 deaths
Fellows of Worcester College, Oxford
Anglo-Saxon studies scholars
English male non-fiction writers
Fellows of the British Academy
Alumni of Magdalen College, Oxford
Fellows of Merton College, Oxford
Fellows of the Society of Antiquaries of London
Historians of England